The 1989 European Baseball Championship was held in France and was won by Italy. The Netherlands finished as runner-up.

Standings

References
(NL) European Championship Archive at honkbalsite

European Baseball Championship
European Baseball Championship
E
1989 in French sport